Hsieh Fa-dah (born 17 May 1950) is a Taiwanese diplomat. He was the ROC representative to Singapore in 2012-2015.

Early life
Hsieh obtained his master's degree in economics from National Chengchi University in 1977.

See also
 Ministry of Foreign Affairs (Republic of China)

References

1950 births
Living people
Representatives of Taiwan to Switzerland
Government ministers of Taiwan
Representatives of Taiwan to Singapore